The St John's Centre is an indoor shopping centre in Leeds, West Yorkshire, England.  The centre is surrounded by The Headrow to the south, Albion Street to the west and Merrion Street to the north.  The centre makes up the central shopping centre to a row of three, that run up through the northern side of Leeds city centre, The Core to the south and the Merrion Centre to the north. The centre has an annual footfall of ten million.  Dortmund Square lies to the front of the centre. In early 2005 the centre was refurbished.

Stores and Restaurants
The main stores as of August 2017 are McDonald's, Poundland, the Post Office, Red Carpet FX and Taco Bell, as well as several independent retailers and restaurants such as Trade Me In, Stampede and Picture The Print. The first floor contains a large cafe.

Former retailers include Topshop and Index. The centre does not have an anchor retailer nor a unit large enough for one.

Layout

The first floor is separated from the ground floor by three adjacent escalators with stairs running either side of them. Lifts also link the floors, however the two floors do not overlap in many places. The ground floor exits onto Dortmund Square on The Headrow, whilst the first floor exits to Albion Street and Merrion Street.

Parking
The centre has an attached large multi-storey car park with 24 hour access operated by Q-Park. It has a total of 282 parking spaces and can be access via Merrion Street to the rear of the centre; there is also direct access to the centre via lift.

References

Shopping centres in Leeds